John Russell Waters (born 8 December 1948) is an Australian film, theatre and television actor, singer, guitarist, songwriter and musician best known in Australia, where he moved to in 1968. He is the son of Scottish actor Russell Waters. John Waters has been in the industry for over 50 years, and was part of the Australian children's television series Play School for 18 years.

Career

Music
Waters was born in London, England. He first faced a live audience as a singer and bass guitar player with 1960s London-based blues band The Riots before travelling to Australia, initially for an extended working holiday and then eventually settling there permanently.

Waters is an accomplished musician, and since 1992 has toured many times with his one-man show Looking Through a Glass Onion. Co-written with friend and musician, Stewart D'Arrietta, the show is a tribute to John Lennon featuring numerous examples of Lennon's music, words and images. In addition to many Australian tours of this show it also played six months in the West End, London. In 2014, it played 120 performances at the Union Square Theatre in Manhattan.

Waters has released a number of CDs including The Story of Pilliga Pete and Clarrie the Cocky (2010), a family story and music CD written and narrated by Waters, Brel (2010) a live album sung in French and a tribute to the Belgian singer-songwriter Jacques Brel, the double live album, John Waters Looking Through A Glass Onion (2011) and his debut originals album Cloudland (2011).

Theatre
Waters’ first big break was in musicals, playing Claude in a Sydney production of Hair in 1969, then Judas in Godspell and Pontius Pilate in the Australian concert production of Jesus Christ Superstar.

He was in the original Australian production of They're Playing Our Song, which opened on 23 August 1980 at the Theatre Royal in Sydney. It starred Waters and Jacki Weaver, with Rhonda Burchmore as one of the Inner Voices. An Australian cast recording of the show was later released by Festival Records.

In 2000, Waters appeared in a production of The Sound of Music, in which he played the part of Captain von Trapp, alongside Lisa McCune as Maria.

In 2005, Waters starred in David Williamson's play Influence as shock jock Ziggi Blasko. The play was performed in Sydney during March/April 2005 and in Melbourne in June/July 2005.

In 2008, he played The Narrator in Richard O'Brien's Rocky Horror Show at Star City Casino, Sydney.

Waters has toured Australia in a critically acclaimed role alongside Brett Tucker in The Woman in Black.

In 2010 he starred in the Melbourne Theatre Company's production of The Swimming Club, a play by Australian author Hannie Rayson.

In 2013 Waters starred in The Addams Family musical as Gomez Addams. The production premiered in Sydney on 24 March 2013 and closed on 9 June 2013.

In 2017, Waters played Ulysses in Music Theatre Melbourne's concert production of Paris. He had previously played the role of Agamemnon on the musical's original concept album released in 1990.

Television

Many Australians still remember Waters best from his nearly 20-year stint on the Australian children's series Play School, appearing from 1972 until 1991. During his tenure with Play School, he narrated various children's video trailers for ABC-TV.

Among his best known television roles is that of the brooding Sergeant Robert McKellar in the 1974–76 television series Rush (revoiced and parodied by The D-Generation as The Olden Days on their comedy program The Late Show).

Waters also appeared in the 1983 Australian miniseries All the Rivers Run as Brenton Edwards.

In 2002, he had a role in the short-lived drama Young Lions.

He played Perry Luscombe in Fireflies, which lasted for only one season, on ABC-TV in 2004.

Waters joined the cast of All Saints in June 2006 as Mike Vlasek, the new head of surgery. He remained with the show until its cancellation in late 2009.

In 2010, Waters was a guest star in Sea Patrol as Sgt. Booker.

In 2010, Waters guest starred in City Homicide as William Clegg.

In 2012, Waters starred in the ABC TV mini-series The Mystery of a Hansom Cab, adapted from the novel by English writer Fergus Hume. He appeared on the Logie-award-winning television series Offspring, which completed filming its third season in 2013 and was renewed for a further two seasons.

From September 2015, Waters joined the cast of the fourth season of the ABC TV series Rake.

In 2018 Waters had a recurring role, as lawyer Travis James, on the ABC TV Series Mystery Road.

Films
Waters played Capt. Alfred Taylor in the 1980 film Breaker Morant which starred British actor Edward Woodward as Harry "Breaker" Morant.

In 1982, Waters appeared in the World War II film Attack Force Z alongside Mel Gibson, John Phillip Law and Sam Neill.

In 2013, Waters starred in a local regional film production created by Luis Bayonas, called Adios.

In 1990, film critic David Stratton, referring to the films, wrote that in his opinion Waters "has been in more bad films than most other actors around".

Other work
He has starred in many television advertisements for various companies including Cinzano, Bird's Eye, Bankers Trust, MBF Health Fund, Sudafed, Uncle Tobys, Qantas, Telstra, MLC, Arnotts and Toyota Hybrid Camry. He has narrated programs such as Mind Games: Real Life Adventures, Nostradamus and Triple Zero Heroes'’All Together Now’'.

Awards
In 1975, Waters won the George Wallace Memorial Logie for Best New Talent at the Logie Awards for his role in Division 4.

In 1988, he won the AFI Award for Best Performance by an Actor in a Leading Role as character Tom Garfield in the Frank Howson-written film Boulevard of Broken Dreams.

He has been nominated for several other awards, including Best Lead Actor (in 1978 for Weekend of Shadows) and Best Supporting Actor in a Drama (in 2006 for All Saints) at the AFI Awards, and for Most Popular Actor in a Telemovie or Mini-Series (in 1992 for Which Way Home) at the Logie Awards.

ARIA Music Awards
The ARIA Music Awards is an annual awards ceremony that recognises excellence, innovation, and achievement across all genres of Australian music. They commenced in 1987. 

! 
|-
| 1994
| Looking Through a Glass Onion''
| Best Original Soundtrack, Cast or Show Album
| 
| 
|-

Personal life

Waters’ first marriage was to actress Jenny Cullen, a union that produced children Ivan and Rebecca Waters. His second marriage was to actress Sally Conabere. His third marriage, to Zoe Burton, was in January 2002, and they became parents to son Archie Waters in January 2003 and twins Gloria & Rusty Waters in September 2006. Waters lives in the Southern Highlands, NSW, with Burton and their three children.

Community work
Waters lends his support to various community events including DUETS 2012, a concert to assist The Australian Children's Music Foundation (ACMF) (founded by fellow Play School presenter Don Spencer) and Carols in the Domain 2012. He is an ambassador for The Australian Children's Music Foundation.

Filmography

References

External links

John Waters fan site

1948 births
20th-century English male actors
20th-century English musicians
21st-century English singers
21st-century English male actors
21st-century English musicians
Australian guitarists
Australian male singers
Australian male stage actors
Australian male film actors
Australian male television actors
Australian songwriters
Best Actor AACTA Award winners
Australian children's television presenters
Living people
Logie Award winners
Male actors from London
English emigrants to Australia
Acoustic guitarists
Australian male guitarists